Loudoun is a parish in East Ayrshire, Scotland and lies between five and ten miles east of Kilmarnock. The parish roughly encompasses the northern half of the Upper-Irvine Valley and borders Galston Parish (which encompasses the remainder of The Valley) at the River Irvine.

Loudoun is a parish, which shares borders with six other parishes. To the south lies the parish of Galston, which of all the surrounding parishes, has the strongest local links to Loudoun, being as the two parishes share strong historical and social links, as well as sharing public services. Otherwise, Loudoun shares borders with the parishes of Avondale (east), Eaglesham (north), East Kilbride (north-east), Fenwick (north-west) and Kilmarnock (west).

Within Loudoun can be found the towns of Darvel and Newmilns, alongside Loudoun Hill, Loudoun Castle, Loudoun Kirk and Loudoun Academy. Notably, claims that Greenholm, Priestland and the town of Galston itself lie within Loudoun are erroneous, as all three lie south of the River Irvine, in the parish of Galston. This may in some part be because Loudoun Academy and surrounding housing hold Galston postcodes.

Loudoun also contained two villages abandoned during the last century, Alton and Loudoun Village.

Etymology
Various theories have been put forward as to the origins of the name Loudoun. One such theory is that the name was originally used in reference to Loudoun Hill, being a combination of two Scots words law and dun, which roughly translates as Firehill. Another Loudoun Hill theory is that the name was originally Lugudunon, which roughly translates as The Fortress of Lugh. It has also been speculated that the name simply derives from the Celtic word, Loddan, which means marshy ground.

History
Whilst the origins of Loudoun's name are up for debate, it is known that by 1186 the name was used to describe the surrounding area, as in this year a Royal Charter granted the Lands of Lowdun to James de Lambinus. At this time the family name was changed to de Lowdun, with the Loudoun family building Loudoun Castle, Loudoun Kirk and The Keep (in Newmilns) over the forthcoming centuries.

Subsequently, the Loudoun family married in to the Crawford family and in doing so, inherited the hereditary title, Sheriff of Ayr. It has been put forward that William Wallace was a relative of the Loudouns, through his mother Margaret Crawford (sister of the 5th Baron, Reginald Crawford), although this claim has been disputed.

According to Blind Harry, Wallace is also said to have fought a battle at Loudoun Hill, during the Scottish Wars of Independence. This claim is largely disputed by historians, with the real Battle of Loudoun Hill being fought between the Scottish forces of Robert Bruce and the English forces of Aymer de Valence on May 10, 1307. Bruce's forces prevailed and whilst the combined forces of both armies probably totalled no more than about 4,000 men, the result is seen as an important step towards Bruce's eventual victory in the Wars of Independence.

Further reading
 James Mair, A Pictorial History of Darvel, 1989
 Craufuird C. Loudoun, A History of the House of Loudoun and Other Associated Families, 1995

See also
John Campbell, 1st Earl of Loudoun
John Nisbet

References

External links
Video, annotation and commentary on the first Loudoun Castle.
Video and commentary on the Loudoun Barony Judge's Hill
Video and commentary on the East Newton Limeworks.
Video and commentary on the ruins at Muttonhole Strip.

Geography of East Ayrshire
Civil parishes of Scotland